Balthazar Korab (1926–2013) was a Hungarian-American photographer based in Detroit, Michigan, specializing in architectural, art and landscape photography.

Biography
Korab was born in Budapest, Hungary, and migrated to France after fleeing from Hungary's communist government in 1949. At the École des beaux-arts in Paris, he completed a diploma of architecture in 1954. For a time, he was a journeyman under the direction of leading European architects, including Le Corbusier.

In 1955, Korab arrived in the United States, and Eero Saarinen employed him to photograph the architectural design process. The architectural community in Detroit embraced Korab's career, and many firms retained him to document their building and private home projects. In 1956 he was awarded fourth place in the international design competition for the Sydney Opera House. Korab documented the 1966 flood of the Arno in Florence, Italy.

In 1994, American President Bill Clinton presented a portfolio of Balthazar Korab's photography to Árpád Göncz, the president of Hungary. Korab died on January 15, 2013, after a long battle with Parkinson's disease.  He is survived by his wife Monica and two children, Christian and Alexandra. Today, Korab's collection is held at the Library of Congress.

Highlights of architectural photography 
 Le Corbusier: Carpenter Center for the Visual Arts, Harvard University; Unité d’Habitation, Marseille
 Mies van der Rohe: Berlin National Gallery; Museum of Fine Arts, Houston
 Louis Isadore Kahn: Salk Institute for Biological Studies, La Jolla, CA; Kimbell Art Museum, Ft. Worth, TX
 Frank Lloyd Wright: Guggenheim Museum, New York; comprehensive coverage of all structures built between 1893 - 1959
 Eero Saarinen: TWA Terminal, JFK Airport, NY; Dulles International Airport, Washington Metropolitan Area; St. Louis Arch; GM Technical Center, Detroit
 Harry Weese: Arena Stage, Washington D.C.; Time-Life Building, Chicago
 Minoru Yamasaki: World Trade Center North Tower and South Tower - comprehensive coverage of model through finished building
 Frank Gehry: Own house in Santa Monica, CA; Weisman Museum, Minneapolis
 Marcel Breuer: Saint John's Abbey, Collegeville, Minnesota; Unesco Headquarters, Paris
 Edward Larrabee Barnes: Christian Theological Seminary, Indianapolis; Walker Art Center, Minneapolis
 Philip Johnson: Transco Tower, Houston; Detroit One Center; Glass House, New Canaan, CT
 I M Pei: Dallas City Hall, National Gallery East Wing, Washington, D.C.; Rock & Roll Hall of Fame, Cleveland
 Cesar Pelli: City Hall San Bernardino, CA; Four Leaf Towers, Houston; Cleveland Clinic
 Skidmore, Owings & Merrill: US Air Force Academy, Colorado Springs; Lutheran Brotherhood, Minneapolis; Grinnell College, Iowa
 Louis Sullivan: National Farmers Bank, Owatonna, MN; Carson Pirie Scott, Chicago

Honors and career highlights 

 1957 Sydney Opera House Competition – Fourth Prize
 1958 Invited by Frank Lloyd Wright to join Taliesin
 1964 American Institute of Architects Medal for Architectural Photography
 1975 Michigan Society of Architects – Honorary Member
 1977-1982 Governor’s Committee on Art in Public Places – Michigan
 1984-1986 Design Editor – Metropolitan Detroit
 1985 American Institute of Architects Detroit Chapter – Honorary Member
 1986 Arts Foundation of Michigan
 1989 Michigan Society of Landscape Architects – Honorary Member
 1998 Cranbrook Educational Community, President’s Design Advisory Committee
 2007 American Institute of Architects Lifetime Achievement Award for Photography; Hungarian Institute of Architects, Honorary Award for Lifetime Achievement

Bibliography
Books and articles featuring Korabs pictures.
 Ferry, W. Hawkins, The Buildings of Detroit; A History, Wayne State University Press, Detroit,  1968
 Hogg, Victor and Balthazar Korab, Legacy of the River Raisin:  The Historic Buildings of Monroe County, Michigan, The Monroe County Historical Society, Monroe, Michigan, 1976.
 Schmitt, Peter and Balthazar Korab, Kalamazoo: Nineteenth-century Homes in a Midwestern Village, Kalamazoo City Historical Commission, Kalamazoo, Michigan,  1976
 Hendry, L Fay,  Outdoor Sculpture in Grand Rapids, iota Press, Okemos, Michigan,  1980
 Hendry, L Fay,  Outdoor Sculpture in Kalamazoo, iota Press, Okemos, Michigan,  1980
 Hendry, L Fay,  Outdoor Sculpture in Lansing,  iota Press, Okemos, Michigan,  1980
 New Deal, Government Architecture, Murals & Sculpture of the 1930s & 1940s: A Walking Tour of East Lansing & Lansing, photographs from the Balthazar Korab Collection ca. 1986
 Farbman, Suzy and James P Gallagher, The Renaissance of the Wayne County Building,  Smith, Hinchman & Grylls Associates, Inc., The Old Wayne County Building Limited Partnership, Walbridge Aldinger Company,  Detroit, Michigan 1989
 Eckert, Kathryn Bishop, Buildings of Michigan, Oxford University Press, New York, 1993
 Eckert, Kathryn Bishop, Cranbrook: The Campus Guide,  Princeton Architectural Press, NY, 2001
 Hill, Eric J. and John Gallagher, AIA Detroit: The American Institute of Architects Guide to Detroit Architecture, Wayne State University Press, Detroit,  2003

References

External links
 Korab Image
 Korab photograph archive at the Library of Congress
 Official Website

American photographers
Hungarian emigrants to the United States
1926 births
2013 deaths
American alumni of the École des Beaux-Arts
Hungarian expatriates in France
Recipients of the AIA Gold Medal